George Arthur "Rusty" Cundieff (born December 13, 1960) is an American film and television director, actor, and writer known for his work on Fear of a Black Hat (1993), Tales from the Hood (1995), and Chappelle's Show (2003–2006).

Biography 
Cundieff was born in Pittsburgh, Pennsylvania to Christina and John A. Cundieff. He studied journalism at Loyola University in New Orleans and the philosophy of religion at the University of Southern California. While at USC, Cundieff became a member of Alpha Phi Alpha, a historically African American fraternity.

He is married to Trina Davis Cundieff, with whom he has two children: Simone Christina and Thelonious Jon Davis.

Film career 
After graduating from USC in 1982, Cundieff performed stand-up comedy in Los Angeles while looking for opportunities to act. His first major role was a year-long run as Theo Carver on Days of Our Lives in 1985. In 1988, he played Big Brother Chucky in Spike Lee's School Daze. Cundieff was inspired by his experience working with Lee on the film to pursue writing and directing in addition to acting, and at age 29 he wrote, directed, and starred in the well-received 1993 rap parody Fear of a Black Hat.

He directed and co-wrote the 1995 horror anthology Tales from the Hood. He directed sequels in 2018 and 2020, Tales from the Hood 2 and Tales from the Hood 3, projects that he said he had been trying to make for 20 years, but that the success of Get Out had opened the door for.

Cundieff was also a correspondent on Michael Moore's comic TV magazine show TV Nation in the mid-1990s.

In 2013, along with 12 others he received a Razzie Award for Worst Director for directing a segment in the anthology comedy film Movie 43.

Filmography

Actor

Director

References

External links

1960 births
Living people
Male actors from Pittsburgh
American male film actors
African-American film directors
African-American television directors
American film directors
American television directors
Television producers from Pennsylvania
University of Southern California alumni
Writers from Pittsburgh
African-American male actors
American male television actors
21st-century African-American people
20th-century African-American people